Facundo Raúl Tello Figueroa (born on 4 May 1982) is an Argentine football referee who is a listed international referee for FIFA since 2019. He has been officiating the highest division of Argentine football league since 2013. On 19 May 2022 FIFA announced the 2022 FIFA World Cup's referee list, where Tello was chosen.

Biography
Facundo Tello was born in Bahía Blanca, in the Buenos Aires Province on 4 May 1982.

Career
Tello debuted in the highest category of Argentine soccer with only four matches in the second division, where he officiated the Godoy Cruz and Vélez Sarsfield match, on the fourteenth date of the 2013 Final Tournament.

Tello, who belongs to the Bahiense Association of Referees, made his first steps in tournaments of the Argentine Soccer Association from 2011, when he debuted in the then Argentine Tournament A.

As he was settled in the first division, Tello officiated the first summer superclassic of 2018, with the Millionaires victory 1–0. That same year, he was summoned to officiate in the return final that defined the second promotion to the 2018-2019 Super League, between San Martín de Tucumán and Sarmiento with a 5–1 victory for San Martín de Tucumán.

In 2019, Tello entered the roster of international referees for FIFA as he was appointed by Conmebol as a 4th official for the South American U-20 Championship in Chile along with his colleagues Fernando Rapallini, Ezequiel Brailosky and Gabriel Chade., becoming the first Bahia collegiate to achieve this distinction.

He was one of the appointed referees to officiate the 2021 FIFA Arab Cup, as he was summoned to officiate the match between Jordan and Morocco. On 6 November 2022, Tello refereed Argentina's Champions Trophy final between Boca Juniors and Racing Club, where he brandished ten red cards (seven red cards to Boca and three to Racing).

References

1982 births
Living people
Referees and umpires
2022 FIFA World Cup referees
Argentine football referees
21st-century Argentine people